Strabomantis cerastes, common name: Palma Real robber frog, is a species of frog in the family Strabomantidae.
It is found in Colombia and Ecuador.
Its natural habitats are subtropical or tropical moist montane forest and heavily degraded former forest.
It is threatened by habitat loss.

References

cerastes
Amphibians of Colombia
Amphibians of Ecuador
Taxonomy articles created by Polbot
Amphibians described in 1975